= Kamsiyo =

- Gender: Unisex
- Language: Igbo

Origin
- Origin: Igboland
- Meaning: As I asked

Other names
- Alternative spelling: Kamsiyochi, Kamsiyonna, Kamsiyochukwu

Kamsiyo is a unisex given name of Igbo origin. As a given name it is typically derived from either Kamsiyochi (As I asked from God), or Kamsiyonna (As I asked from my father).
